Caitlin Sammons (born October 31, 1993) is an American mixed martial artist. She competes in the flyweight division of the Invicta Fighting Championships.

Mixed martial arts career

Invicta Fighting Championships 

Sammons made her Invicta debut on February 15, 2019, against Christina Ricker at  Invicta FC 34. She won the fight by technical knockout in round two.

Her next fight came on August 9, 2019, facing Chantel Coates at Invicta FC 36. She won the fight via a rear-naked choke in round two.

On July 30, 2020, Sammons faced Claire Guthrie at  Invicta FC 41. She won the fight via split decision.

Sammons  faced Stephanie Geltmacher on November 20, 2020 at Invicta FC 43. She lost the fight via knockout in round one.

Simmons faced Helen Peralta at Invicta FC 44: A New Era on August 27, 2021. Simmons lost via unanimous decision.

Personal life
Simmons graduated with a bachelor's degree in Sports and Exercise Science.

Mixed martial arts record 

|-
|Loss
|align=center|  3–2
|Helen Peralta
|Decision (unanimous)
|Invicta FC 44
|
|align=center|3
|align=center|5:00
|Kansas City, Kansas, United States
|
|-
| Loss
| align=center|  3–1
| Stephanie Geltmacher
| KO (punches)
| Invicta FC 43
| 
| align=center| 1
| align=center| 4:28
| Atlantic City, New Jersey, United States
|
|-
| Win
| align=center|  3–0
| Claire Guthrie
| Decision (split)
| Invicta FC 41
| 
| align=center| 3
| align=center| 5:00
| Salt Lake City, Utah, United States
|
|-
| Win
| align=center|2–0
| Chantel Coates
| Submission (rear-naked choke)
| Invicta FC 36
| 
| align=center| 2
| align=center| 4:10
| Kansas City, Missouri, United States
|
|-
| Win
| align=center| 1–0
| Christina Ricker
| TKO (elbows and punches)
| Invicta FC 34
| 
| align=center| 2
| align=center| 3:02
| Kansas City, Missouri, United States
|
|-

See also 
 List of current Invicta FC fighters

References

External links 
 
 Caitlin Sammons at Invicta FC

1993 births
Living people
American female mixed martial artists
Flyweight mixed martial artists
Mixed martial artists utilizing Brazilian jiu-jitsu
American practitioners of Brazilian jiu-jitsu
Female Brazilian jiu-jitsu practitioners
21st-century American women